Thyonicola is a genus of  parasitic sea snails, marine gastropod mollusks or micromollusks in   the Eulimidae family.

Species
Species within the genera Thyonicola include:
 Thyonicola americana Tikasingh, 1961
 Thyonicola dogieli (A. V. Ivanov, 1945)
 Thyonicola mortenseni Mandahl-Barth, 1941

References

 Warén A. (1984) A generic revision of the family Eulimidae (Gastropoda, Prosobranchia). Journal of Molluscan Studies suppl. 13: 1-96.

Eulimidae